Anastasia Petrovna Dobromyslova-Martin (born 26 September 1984) is a professional darts player. She is a three-time Women's World Professional Darts Champion of the British Darts Organisation (BDO).

After winning her first title in 2008, Dobromyslova decided to join the rival male-dominated Professional Darts Corporation (PDC) to play in their World Championship in 2009. After rejoining the BDO in 2011, she won her second World Championship in 2012 and a third in 2013.

Dobromyslova uses the song  "Bring Me to Life" by Evanescence.  She carries the name From Russia with Love, although she has stated herself that it is not an official nickname. She is more commonly known as just Anastasia due to the difficulty English-speaking commentators and announcers have pronouncing her surname.

Career
Dobromyslova started to play darts at the age of 12, and has won the Russian National Championship a total of 10 times.  According to Dobromyslova, it was quite easy because hardly anyone played the game in Russia.  She won the Girls' World Masters title in 2001 and won the WDF Europe Youth Cup singles title in 2001 and 2002.

She made her professional major debut at the 2004 Bavaria World Darts Trophy, where she beat Trina Gulliver in the quarter final, averaging 90. After beating Mieke de Boer in the semis, she lost to Francis Hoenselaar in the final.

In 2007, Dobromyslova made her debut in the BDO World Championship at Lakeside, as the number 4 seed, reaching the semi-finals. After beating Sweden's Carina Ekberg in the quarter-finals, she fell to eventual winner, Trina Gulliver. During the year, she won the England Open and the British Open, amongst several other singles titles across Europe. In October, she represented Russia in the 2007 WDF World Cup in the Netherlands, and won the ladies' pairs title with Irina Armstrong.

In 2008, she returned to Lakeside, again as the number 4 seed, for the World Championship.  She defeated Dee Bateman in the first round and Stephanie Smee in the semi-finals, before defeating Trina Gulliver in the final by two sets to nil, ending Gulliver's seven-year unbeaten run as world champion.

Dobromyslova made headlines when she qualified for the 2008 UK Open, a PDC major tournament, by winning through the Pub Qualifiers event, beating Darren Place 5–2 and Pete Galloway 5–0. In the first round, she was drawn to play Robert Thornton, who was also a BDO player who won through the Pub Qualifiers, and was the reigning World Masters champion. Thornton narrowly won 6–5.

She was named the number one seed for the 2008 Zuiderduin Masters, but was excluded from playing by the Dutch authorities after problems with her visa, and was forced to withdraw. She was replaced by Lisa Ashton.

Dobromyslova received an invitation from the PDC to play in the 2008 Grand Slam of Darts, as BDO Ladies' world champion. It was the first time a female darts player was invited to play at the Grand Slam. In her group, she was drawn with reigning PDC world champion John Part, Kevin McDine, and Wayne Mardle. After losing her opening match 5–1 to Part, she gave Mardle a scare when she came from 4–0 to take four consecutive legs, including a Shanghai 120 checkout and a 116, before Mardle won the deciding leg. A third defeat occurred when she lost 5–2 to McDine.

In December, she went into the 2008 World Masters as the number one ranked ladies' darts player, and reached the final, where she lost to Hoenselaar. Just a few hours later, however, it was announced that Dobromyslova had left the WDF/BDO circuit, and had joined the PDC on a full-time basis, after she was awarded a wildcard entry into the 2009 PDC World Darts Championship following the withdrawal of an unnamed Indian qualifier, a decision that was publicly criticised by five-time world champion Eric Bristow.

Dobromyslova became the second female player to play in a men's world darts championship, after Canadian Gayl King played in the 2001 event.  She was drawn in the preliminary round against Remco van Eijden, and lost 5 legs to 3.

She qualified again for the UK Open in 2009, this time through her UK Open Order of Merit ranking, having won £500 in seven qualifying events. She played amateur qualifier Andy Roberts in the first round and lost 6–2.

Following their failed takeover bid of the BDO, the PDC introduced their own Women's World Championship, and Dobromyslova automatically qualified as the only female member of the PDPA. She lost in the semi-finals to Stacy Bromberg, who went on the beat Tricia Wright in the final.

At the 2009 Grand Slam of Darts, Dobromyslova was drawn with Phil Taylor, Vincent van der Voort, and Mark Webster. After suffering a 5–0 whitewash from Taylor in her first group match, Dobromyslova defeated van der Voort 5–4. It was her first ever win against a man on television, and made her only the second woman to beat a male professional darts player in a major televised darts competition, the first being Deta Hedman's defeats of Aaron Turner and Norman Fletcher in the 2005 UK Open. She still finished bottom of the group, however, as van der Voort unexpectedly beat Taylor 5–1 two days later, whilst she lost her last group game to Webster 5–2.

Dobromyslova failed to qualify for the PDC World Championship in 2010 and 2011, despite entering the Russian PDC qualifying events.  In the 2010 qualifier, she lost in the final to Roman Konchikov, and she lost again in the final, to Andrei Ratnikov in the 2011 event. Ratnikov later withdrew from the competition after he was unable to travel to England for family reasons. PDC awarded his preliminary round place to the runner-up of the PDPA qualifying event (which later turned out to be Matt Padgett), rather than Dobromyslova.

Dobromyslova represented Russia in the first ever PDC World Cup of Darts along with Konchikov.  The pair beat Gibraltar, paired by Dylan Duo and Dyson Parody, in the first round, before losing to Scotland's Gary Anderson and Robert Thornton.

On 24 December 2010, it was rumoured amongst several darts internet forums that Dobromyslova had resigned from the PDC and returned to play in BDO and WDF events.  On 1 January 2011, during the BBC's broadcast of the 2011 BDO World Darts Championship, commentator David Croft announced that Dobromyslova was indeed returning to play in the BDO circuit. Anastasia herself confirmed over a week later, via her Twitter page, that she had left the PDC and was preparing for the Dutch Open. She later said she moved back to the BDO for monetary reasons.

She qualified for the 2012 BDO World Darts Championship, where in the quarter final, she defeated second seeded Welsh woman Julie Gore by two sets to nil. In the semi finals, she defeated third seed and title holder Trina Gulliver again by two sets to nil. Dobromyslova then recovered from losing the first set and needing to break her opponent Deta Hedman's throw to stay in the match to win her second world championship two sets to one.

In 2013 Dobromyslova won her third World title after beating Lisa Ashton 2–1 in sets.

Soft tip darts 
Dobromyslova also plays soft tip darts competitively, as well as steel-tip darts, having represented Russia at the International Darts Federation (IDF) World Cup and European Darts Union (EDU) European Championship. She is a former world and European champion in the sport.

She became the 2011 European singles champion in Benidorm. At the IDF World Cup in 2011, Dobromyslova won the Pro Singles Cricket event, but lost the Pro Singles (501) event final, and also won the Pro Mixed Pairs event.

Dobromyslova became European champion again in 2012. At the 2012 IDF World Cup, Dobromyslova beat Stacy Bromberg to win the Pro Singles (501) event. It meant she became the first woman to become the soft-tip and steel-tip (501) world darts champion in the same year. She lost the Pro Cricket Singles event final to Bromberg, but won the team event with Russia. Russia became the first European team to win the team event.

World Championship results

PDC
 2009: Preliminary Round (lost to Remco van Eijden 3–5)
 2010: Semi Finals (lost 3-4 (l) to Stacy Bromberg) (Women's only tournament)
2019: First Round (lost to Ryan Joyce 0–3)

BDO
 2007: Semi Final (lost to Trina Gulliver 0–2)
 2008: Winner (beat Trina Gulliver 2–0)
 2012: Winner (beat Deta Hedman 2–1)
 2013: Winner (beat Lisa Ashton 2–1)
 2014: Semi Final (lost to Lisa Ashton 1–2)
 2015: Semi Final (lost to Fallon Sherrock 1–2)
 2016: First round (lost to Anca Zijlstra 1–2)
 2017: Semi Final (lost to Corrine Hammond 0–2)
 2018: Runner Up (lost to Lisa Ashton 1–3)
 2019: Semi Final (lost to Lorraine Winstanley 1–2)
 2020: Quarter Final (lost to Mikuru Suzuki 0–2)

Career finals

WDF / BDO major youth finals: 4 (3 titles, 1 runner-up)

WDF major youth team finals: 1 (1 title)

WDF / BDO major finals: 18 (9 titles, 9 runners-up)

WDF major team finals: 1 (1 title)

Performance timeline

Personal life
Dobromyslova is married to Tony Martin, who qualified for the 2005 BDO World Darts Championship and resides in Ellesmere Port, Cheshire, England. Their first child, a son called Joseph, was born in February 2017.

She is the first and the only darts player to date to be awarded the honorary title "Merited Master of Sport of Russia".

Notes

References

External links
 Official site
 Profile and stats on Darts Database
 Anastasia's profile on the Unicorn website

Russian darts players
1984 births
Living people
People from Ellesmere Port
Sportspeople from Tver
BDO women's world darts champions
PDC World Cup of Darts Russian team
Professional Darts Corporation former pro tour players
Professional Darts Corporation women's players